Mario González (born 8 September 1901, date of death unknown) was an Uruguayan boxer who competed in the 1924 Summer Olympics. In 1924 he was eliminated in the first round of the bantamweight class after losing his fight to Oscar Andrén.

References 

1901 births
Year of death missing
Bantamweight boxers
Olympic boxers of Uruguay
Boxers at the 1924 Summer Olympics
Uruguayan male boxers